The Belarusian Autocephalous Orthodox Church (Bielaruskaja aŭtakiefaĺnaja pravaslaŭnaja carkva BAPC), sometimes abbreviated as B.A.O. Church or BAOC, is an independent religious body in the Eastern Orthodox tradition. Due to persecution against the Church and Belarusian culture in the Republic of Belarus, it exists either underground or abroad.

The Church separated from the Russian Orthodox Church on 23 July 1922, in an attempt to revive a national Church in the territory of the Byelorussian Soviet Socialist Republic which before the partitions of Poland existed as eparchies (diocese) of Eastern Orthodox Church in the Polish-Lithuanian Commonwealth and under Ecumenical Patriarchate of Constantinople.

Following the German occupation of Byelorussia, the church was re-established on 30 August 1942; the effort was supported by the Belarusian Central Council and the Polish Orthodox Church. With the advance of the Red Army in 1944, BAPC leaders largely emigrated to Germany.

On 5 June 1948, bishops and members of the BAPC which had managed to escape from the Soviet Union met in Konstanz (on the Lake Constance) and reorganized their activities abroad with the help of its sister church the Ukrainian Autocephalous Orthodox Church and its primate Polikarp (Sikorsky).

The church is currently based in Brooklyn, New York City and is mainly active within the Belarusian diaspora. It has ten parishes: three in the United States, three in Australia, one in Canada, one in the United Kingdom and, since 2010, one in Belarus; it also has a mission in the United States. It has been led by Metropolitan Sviataslaw (Login) since 2008.

Its activities in Belarus are strongly opposed by the Belarusian Exarchate of the Russian Orthodox Church, the Russian Orthodox Church itself as well as governments of both Belarus as well as the Russian Federation.

Primates
 1922–1931 Melchizedek (Pajewski)
 1931–1937 Filaret (Ramenski)
 1942–1946 Panteleimon (Rozhnovsky) (as part of the Moscow Patriarchate)
 Filafei (Narko), temporary
 1946–1948 Aleksandr (Inozemtsev), temporary
 1948–1971 Serhiy (Okhotenko)
 1972–1983 Andrei (Kryt)
 1984–2007 Iziaslav (Brutskiy)
 2008–present Sviataslaw (Login)

See also
 Belarusian Greek Catholic Church
 Belarusian Exarchate of the Russian Orthodox Church

References

 Article on the Belarusian Autocephalous Orthodox Church by Ronald Roberson on the CNEWA web site

External links
 Website of Belarusian A. O. Church (in Belarusian and English)

Eastern Orthodoxy in Belarus
Eastern Orthodox Church bodies in Europe
Independent Eastern Orthodox denominations